is a Japanese Nippon Professional Baseball pitcher with the Hokkaido Nippon-Ham Fighters in Japan's Pacific League.

External links

1978 births
Hokkaido Nippon-Ham Fighters players
Japanese baseball players
Komazawa University alumni
Living people
Nippon Ham Fighters players
Nippon Professional Baseball pitchers
Baseball people from Tokushima Prefecture